Hercules H. Burnett (August 13, 1865 – October 4, 1936), was a Major League Baseball player who was mainly a center fielder for the Louisville Colonels.  He played briefly for the Colonels in  while the team was in the American Association, and in again  when the Colonels were a member of the National League.  His career consisted of six games played, and in 21 at bats he collected 7 hits for a .333 batting average and .714 slugging average.  He died at the age of 71 in his hometown of Louisville, Kentucky, and is interred at Eastern Cemetery.

See also
List of Major League Baseball players with a home run in their final major league at bat

References

External links

1865 births
1936 deaths
Major League Baseball center fielders
Baseball players from Kentucky
Louisville Colonels players
19th-century baseball players
Minor league baseball managers
Milwaukee Cream Citys players
Terre Haute (minor league baseball) players
Evansville Hoosiers players
Evansville Black Birds players
Detroit Tigers (Western League) players
Omaha Omahogs players
St. Joseph Saints players
Fort Wayne Indians players
Montgomery Black Sox players